William Thomas Ring (born December 13, 1956) is a former NFL running back who played six seasons in the National Football League from (1981–1986). He was a reserve and special teams player for the San Francisco 49ers during the early success of the Bill Walsh era. Ring was considered a fan-favorite who was thought too small and too slow to be an NFL player but somehow found a way to hang on in the league for 6 years. He caught his first and only TD pass on December 6, 1981 against the Cincinnati Bengals at Riverfront Stadium, a game the 49ers would win 21-3. He currently resides in the San Francisco Bay Area with his wife, Connie, and their three children. His son, Billy is a former safety for the San Jose State Spartans. He also has two daughters who both played D1 volleyball. The oldest, Katie, played for the UCSB Gauchos, and the youngest, Christie, played for the SDSU Aztecs.

References

External links
pro-football-reference.com profile
database football.com profile

1956 births
Living people
Players of American football from Des Moines, Iowa
American football running backs
BYU Cougars football players
Pittsburgh Steelers players
San Francisco 49ers players